Tokmak Solar Energy was the largest solar power plant in Ukraine with total area of 96 hectares (100 soccer fields) and the power capacity of 50 MW. It is located near the city of Tokmak in the Zaporizhzhia Oblast. It was dismantled and stolen by Russian soldiers when they occupied the city of Tokmak in Ukraine during 2022 Russian invasion of Ukraine.

History 
Tokmak Solar Energy LLC was established on June 9, 2011.

The station was opened in 2018. The capacity of the first stage was 11 MW, and was later increased to 50 MW. The construction of the power station cost 45 million euros. The power plant supplied energy to six districts of Zaporizhia Oblast. On 23 June 2022, it became known that during the Russian invasion of Ukraine, the Russians occupiers have stolen the solar panels and took them to Russia.

References 

Buildings and structures destroyed during the 2022 Russian invasion of Ukraine
Former power stations in Ukraine
Solar power stations in Ukraine
2011 establishments in Ukraine
2022 disestablishments in Ukraine